Huntington station is a historic railroad depot located at Huntington, Cabell County, West Virginia. It was built in 1887, by the Huntington and Big Sandy Railroad, later the Baltimore and Ohio Railroad.  The former passenger station is two stories and constructed of brick with a slate roof and two chimneys. The former baggage section to the east is one story.  The front facade of the former passenger station features a bay window extending from the basement to the roof and dividing it into two sections.  At the rear of the passenger station is the former freighthouse.  The freighthouse is a brick building with a slate roof completed in 1890, and expanded in 1897, 1911, and 1916. 

The complex includes an original steam engine with a "Pullman" train car, an outdoor performance area, and a building that used to house one of Huntington's first banks—which was the easternmost bank robbed by the James-Younger Gang. Heritage Station was turned into a shopping center called "Heritage Village" during the 1970s. For decades, the station sat hidden and virtually unused just two blocks from the city center, until Create Huntington got involved in 2006. Today, Heritage Station is an artisan retail complex, with locally owned shops, and home to public events like the annual Diamond Teeth Mary Blues Festival, named for the blues singer born in the town. 

It was listed on the National Register of Historic Places in 1973 as the Baltimore and Ohio Railroad Depot.

References

External links

Railway stations on the National Register of Historic Places in West Virginia
Railway stations in the United States opened in 1887
Buildings and structures in Huntington, West Virginia
National Register of Historic Places in Cabell County, West Virginia
Former Baltimore and Ohio Railroad stations
1887 establishments in West Virginia
Former railway stations in West Virginia